Mata da Estrela Private Natural Heritage Reserve is a private natural heritage reserve in the state of Rio Grande do Norte, Brazil.

Location

It is owned by Destilaria Baía Formosa and is part of the  Fazenda Pedrosa in the municipality of Baía Formosa, Rio Grande do Norte.
The reserve was created on 30 March 2000 by Marilia Marreco Cerqueira, President of the Brazilian Institute of Environment and Renewable Natural Resources (IBAMA).
It takes its name Mata da Estrela (Star Forest) from its shape.
The forest is beside the sea on dunes.

Environment

The reserve holds a remnant of Atlantic Forest in an area that was largely deforested to make way for sugar cane plantations.
The forest is open to visitors who wish to experience the varied flora and fauna.
A local guide will interpret the environment.
The reserve holds the Lagoa Araraquara, also called the Coca-Cola Lagoon due to its dark colour.
Pau-Brasil (Caesalpinia echinata) is native to the forest. 
There are Gameleira trees (of the family Moraceae) with a diameter equal to 8 men holding hands.
The fauna and flora of the forest are being mapped and described by NGOs and universities authorized by the owner.

Notes

Sources

2000 establishments in Brazil
Protected areas of Rio Grande do Norte
Private natural heritage reserves of Brazil